Munter or Münter is a surname. Notable people with the surname include:

 Alex Munter (born 1968), Canadian politician and journalist, CEO of the Children's Hospital of Eastern Ontario
 Cameron Munter (born 1954), US Ambassador to Pakistan
 Friedrich Münter (1761-1830), Danish bishop and scholar 
 Gabriele Münter (1887-1962) German Expressionist artist
 Leilani Münter (born 1976), American race car driver and environmental activist
 Rosanna Munter (born 1987), Swedish singer
 Scott Munter (born 1980), American baseball pitcher
 Werner Munter (born 1941), Swiss mountain guide, author, and safety expert

See also
 Jared Mason, nicknamed "Munter", a fictional character in the television show Outrageous Fortune
 Münter hitch, a simple knot commonly used by climbers and cavers, invented by Werner Munter
 Carl Munters (1897-1989), Swedish inventor